Jám Nizámuddín II (1439–1509), also known as Jam Nizam al-Din or Jám Nindó, was the 15th Sultan of Sindh from Samma dynasty between 1461 and 1508 CE. His capital was Thatta in modern-day southern Pakistan. After his death, his son Jám Ferózudin lost the Sultanate in 1525 CE to an invading army of Shah Beg Arghun, who had been thrown out of Kandahar by Babur.

Tomb
Nizamuddin's grave is located on Makli Hill and part of the world heritage site of Historical Monuments at Makli. The tomb is an impressive stone structure with fine ornamental carving similar to the 15th-century Gujrat style. It has been restored but suffers from cracks and wall distortions caused by rough weathering and erosion of the slope on which it stands.  

Cousens wrote in The Antiquities of Sind:

See also
 Samma (tribe)

References

This article includes content derived from "History of Sind - translated from Persian books" by Mirza Kalichbeg Fredunbeg (1853–1929), published in Karachi in 1902 and now in the public domain.

External links

مکلی کے شہرِ خموشاں میں جام نندو کا مقبرہ

15th-century rulers in Asia
Pakistani royalty
History of Sindh
Jamote people

Sindhi people
Samma dynasty